J. Wellington Wimpy, generally referred to as Wimpy, is one of the characters in the comic strip Popeye, created by E. C. Segar and originally called Thimble Theatre, and in the Popeye cartoons based upon the strip. Wimpy debuted in the strip in 1931 and was one of the dominant characters in the newspaper strip, but when Popeye was adapted as an animated cartoon series by Fleischer Studios, Wimpy became a minor character; Dave Fleischer said that the character in the original Segar strip was "too smart" to be used in the film cartoon adaptations. Wimpy appears in Robert Altman's 1980 live-action musical film Popeye, played by Paul Dooley.

Inspiration 
The character seems to have been inspired by more than one person whom Segar had encountered. Wimpy's personality was based upon that of William Schuchert, the manager of the Chester Opera House where Segar was first employed. "Windy Bill", as he was known, was a pleasant, friendly man, fond of tall tales and hamburgers.

Additional sources suggest that Segar composed the character's name from the names of two other acquaintances. According to fellow cartoonist Bill Mauldin, the name was suggested by that of Wellington J. Reynolds, one of Segar's instructors at the Chicago Art Institute. In a brief 1935 interview in The Daily Oklahoman, H. Hillard Wimpee of Atlanta indicated that he was connected to the character, having worked with Segar at the Chicago Herald-Examiner in 1917. It became a custom in the office that whoever accepted an invitation for a hamburger would pay the bill. According to Wimpee, after seeing the character in the newspaper, he wrote to Segar in 1932 about Wimpy, "afraid of being connected with what [Segar] was doing with [the character]." He said Segar replied, "You haven't seen anything yet."

Character
Wimpy is Popeye's friend, and plays the role of “straight man” to Popeye.  Wimpy is a soft-spoken romantic, intelligent and educated, a lazy coward, a miser, and a glutton.  He is a scam artist, and almost a tramp, but pretends to have high social status.  Besides mooching hamburgers, he also picks up discarded cigars.  Popeye often tries to reform Wimpy's character, but Wimpy never reforms.

Hamburgers are Wimpy's all-time favorite food, and he is usually seen carrying or eating one or more at a time – e.g., in Popeye the Sailor Meets Sindbad the Sailor he is seen grinding meat or eating burgers almost the entire time – however, he is usually too cheap to pay for them himself. A recurring joke involves Wimpy's attempts to con other patrons of the diner owned by Rough House into buying his meal for him. His best-known catchphrase started in 1931 as, "Cook me up a hamburger. I'll pay you Tuesday." In 1932, this then became the famous "I'll gladly pay you Tuesday for a hamburger today". Rough House explains why Wimpy is able to get away with this tactic in one strip, stating that "He never comes around on Tuesday". Rough House once suffered a mental breakdown from Wimpy's shenanigans, and demanded that Wimpy be kept out of his hospital room. Wimpy disobeyed this command, resulting in a rare altercation with Popeye. The phrase was also slightly altered in the episode "Spree Lunch" to "I'll have a hamburger, for which I will gladly pay you Tuesday." This phrase is now commonly used to illustrate financial irresponsibility and still appears in modern comedies such as The Drew Carey Show and The Office. The initial part of the phrase was even the title of Episode 6 of the fourth season of Cheers "I'll Gladly Pay You Tuesday."

In Robert Altman's 1980 live-action musical film Popeye, where Wimpy was played by veteran character actor Paul Dooley, one of Harry Nilsson's original songs, "Everything Is Food", featured Dooley singing the catch-phrase, as he took a hamburger, as "I would gladly pay you Tuesday for a hamburger today." The response from the chorus, as they reclaimed the same hamburger from him, uneaten, was "He would gladly pay you Tuesday for a hamburger today." Later in the film, a sign in a restaurant reads "Positively NO CREDIT. This means YOU, Wimpy."

Wimpy had other frequently used lines in the original comic strip. On some occasions, Wimpy tries to placate someone by saying, "I'd like to invite you over to my house for a duck dinner." He then moves away quickly to a safe distance and yells, "You bring the ducks!" Another such line was, "Jones is my name...I'm one of the Jones boys" – an attempt to defuse a hostile situation with a mistaken identity. To deflect an enemy's wrath, he would sometimes indicate a third party and say, "Let's you and him fight", starting a brawl from which he quickly withdrew. He also said "Shake hands, my friend...I want to start my wristwatch" on occasion, once more a reference to his lazy behavior. Wimpy is especially fond of duck hunting, and goes hunting with Popeye on numerous occasions, but usually gains his ducks in dishonest ways as well. 

Wimpy's mother made a cameo appearance in the Sunday strips. She is an elderly widow. Popeye and Rough House both try to make Wimpy seem as respectable as possible when she visits, because she doesn't know about her son's disreputable behavior. On one occasion, Popeye almost makes the truth come out by remarking that Wimpy is a loafer, but then relieves Mrs. Wimpy by stating that Wimpy is actually a baker who "makes loaves" and that he was only having a good natured jest. In the daily strips, Wimpy was appointed general of Popeye's country, Popilania, and injured his head by saluting. 

Wimpy made two cameo appearances in the Segar universe outside of the Thimble Theater comic strip. He appeared once in the side feature "Popeye's Cartoon Club," as an example of how not to behave, and once in a Sappo strip. The Sappo occurrence came out when Professor O.G. Wotasnozzle invented a machine that would produce synthetic hamburger, only to discover that Wimpy was going to eat it all. This led Sappo to say, "Yeah, break it up... we don't want him around," indicating that they both somehow knew about Wimpy's obsession with hamburgers. Wotasnozzle promptly destroys the device with a hammer. This storyline break was equally as bizarre as the iconic joke with Sappo's nose where Sappo's elongated nose breaks a panel and becomes the swing on which a child (In Popeye's Cartoon Club) is swinging. 

Wimpy is an annoyance and an irritant to his nemesis, Nazilian shoemaker George W. Geezil, a satirical immigrant character, who goes so far as to poison Wimpy and shoot him. He has a habit of slurping soup. In Geezil's opinion, "He should be killed to death!" This, too, was a repetitive catchphrase. In the Plunder Island storyline, Wimpy disguises himself as Alice the Goon and scares Geezil off the boat. Geezil attempts to commit suicide upon learning that he is in close proximity to Wimpy on board the ship. Wimpy also converts the Sea Hag's five lions into hamburgers through the use of a meat grinder. He refuses to eat a cheese sandwich that Olive Oyl offers him. He tries to make an ape into a hamburger, but the ape refuses to submit. The Plunder Island storyline also contained a creative alteration of one of Wimpy's famous lines. Upon coming to a cannibal island, a cannibal says to Wimpy, "Come on down to the house for a duck dinner...you BE the duck". 

In one storyline, Popeye, Olive Oyl, Swee'Pea, and Castor Oyl go on a trip to the desert to find gold. After leaving his landlady with an enormous amount of bills, he gets lost in the desert and separated from the rest of the group, in part because he drank Swee'Pea's milk and wasted his own rations. He gets "Desert Madness", a condition which involves long poems and illusions. He eventually reunites with his friends, and finds a cache of gold but admits that he wasn't working hard to look for the gold, he was only trying to kill a snake with his pickaxe. While at home, Wimpy ponders his gold, and a caption states that "he may take unto himself a wife..." This storyline was either scrapped or forgotten, however; Wimpy never gets married for the rest of the Segar strips. 

Wimpy does have romance in his soul, however, although usually with ulterior motives. Popeye once found that Rough House had employed a sexy waitress, but Wimpy decided that he was in love with her instead. When Popeye kicks him out to make love, Wimpy betrays Popeye and informs Olive Oyl that Popeye is cheating, resulting in a catfight between Olive and the sexy waitress. In another incident, Wimpy tried to seduce Olive herself by stating that he was, in reality, an eccentric millionaire who hid his money beneath a rock. Olive falls for the ploy, but stops falling for it when Wimpy states that he forgot his hiding place. In yet another notable incident, Wimpy had his own lover, Waneeta, but only loved her because her father owned a herd of beef cows.

In popular culture
Wimpy (along with Popeye, Olive and Bluto) was going to have a cameo in Who Framed Roger Rabbit, but the rights to the characters could not be obtained.
During World War II, "Wimpy", in reference to the character, was the nickname given to the Vickers Wellington bomber.
Wimpy is also the namesake of the large chain of Wimpy hamburger restaurants which was founded in Bloomington, Indiana in the 1930s and opened in the UK in 1954; it has maintained operations overseas since 1967. Their UK website states, "The name Wimpy is believed to have come from Popeye's friend J Wellington Wimpy who loved hamburgers as much as Popeye loved spinach."
Wimpy can also be found as the mascot for "Wimpy's Seafood Restaurant and Market" in Osterville, Massachusetts on Cape Cod. (Established 1938)
Wimpy made a cameo appearance (as an in-gag to both his facial features; in the context of beef related heart disease and affinity for hamburgers) in the Family Guy episode "McStroke".
Wimpy has appeared in two episodes of the Adult Swim animated series Robot Chicken, often using his "I'll gladly pay you Tuesday" line to buy hamburgers. Often it fails. Voiced by Scott Adsit and Seth Green.
In the Good Eats second season episode "Daily Grind" (aka "A Grind is a Terrible Thing to Waste"), Alton Brown prepares the "perfect burger" (as well as meatloaf & meatballs) for a character named "J. Wellington Whimpy" (misspelled, but looking mostly like the version of Wimpy played by Paul Dooley in the Popeye film) played by then cast regular Steve Rooney.
In the final Pooch the Pup cartoon called She Done Him Right, a dog character looking like Wimpy is seen playing a slot machine.
Wimpy's famous catchphrase gives the name to the hamburger review website A Hamburger Today.
Wimpy is also the focus of an animated Bank of America commercial in which he uses a new smartphone app to finally pay for the food he mooched from his friends.
Season 4 Episode 6 of Cheers is named "I'll Gladly Pay You Tuesday".
Season 6 Episode 8 of Frasier, Niles refers to Claudia Kynock, a wealthy media owner, as a bulbous cartoon character who steals hamburgers.  Frasier correctly asserts "Wimpy" but after Niles makes a series of self-deprecating remarks.
Season 2 Episode 14 of The Office, Michael can be heard whispering to Stanley "I'll gladly pay you Tuesday for a hamburger today".
In the hit video game World of Warcraft, an NPC named Topper McNabb can be heard repeating "I'll gladly pay you Tuesday for a hamburger today" in the city of Stormwind, among other phrases.
In the cartoon "A Clean Shaven Man", the name of his barber shop is called Wimby's not Wimpy's; however while the sign on the door of the empty shop reads "out getting a haircut", Bluto remarks "I'll bet he's out getting some hamburgers", and Popeye responds "I wouldn't be at all surprised".
In a May 12, 2020 9 Chickweed Lane strip, Wimpy's catchphrase was mentioned along with a thinly-veiled romantic innuendo between characters Amos and Edda  and also in a May 2, 2022 strip, this time involving recurring characters Hugh and Xiulan in the same manner.

See also

Mr Micawber
Harold Skimpole

References

External links
 Popeye | The Home of Popeye the Sailor Man

Comic book sidekicks
Fictional con artists
Fictional tricksters
Popeye characters
Animated human characters
Comics characters introduced in 1931
Fictional American people
Male characters in animation
Male characters in comics